Ammonium fluorosilicate (also known as ammonium hexafluorosilicate, ammonium fluosilicate or ammonium silicofluoride) has the formula (NH4)2SiF6. It is a toxic chemical, like all salts of fluorosilicic acid. It is made of white crystals, which have at least three polymorphs and appears in nature as rare minerals cryptohalite or bararite.

Structure 
Ammonium fluorosilicate has three major polymorphs: α-(NH4)2[SiF6] form is cubic (space group Fm3m, No. 225) and corresponds to the mineral cryptohalite. The β form is trigonal (scalenohedral) and occurs in nature as mineral bararite. A third (γ) form was discovered in 2001 and identified with the hexagonal 6mm symmetry. In all three configurations, the [SiF6]2− octahedra are arranged in layers. In the α form, these layers are perpendicular to [111] directions. In the β- and γ- forms, the layers are perpendicular to the c-axis. (Note: trigonal symmetry is part of the hexagonal group, but not all hexagonal crystals are trigonal.) The silicon atoms of α-(NH4)2[SiF6] (alpha), have cubic close packing (CCP). The γ form has hexagonal close packing and the β-(NH4)2[SiF6] has primitive hexagonal packing. In all three phases, 12 fluorine atoms neighbor the (NH4)+.

Although bararite was claimed to be metastable at room temperature, it does not appear one polymorph has ever turned into another. Still, bararite is fragile enough that grinding it for spectroscopy will produce a little cryptohalite. Even so, ammonium fluorosilicate assumes a trigonal form at pressures of 0.2 to 0.3 GPa. The reaction is irreversible. If it is not bararite, the phase is at least very closely related.

The hydrogen bonding in (NH4)2[SiF6] allows this salt to change phases in ways that normal salts cannot. Interactions between cations and anions are especially important in how ammonium salts change phase. (To learn more about the β-structure, see Bararite.)

Natural occurrence
This chemical makes rare appearances in nature. It is found as a sublimation product of fumaroles and coal fires. As a mineral, it is either called cryptohalite or bararite, the two being two polymorphs of the compound.

Chemical properties and health hazards
Ammonium fluorosilicate is noncombustible, but it will still release dangerous fumes in a fire, including hydrogen fluoride, silicon tetrafluoride, and nitrogen oxides. It will corrode aluminium. In water, ammonium fluorosilicate dissolves to form an acid solution.

Inhaling dust can lead to pulmonary irritation, possibly death. Ingestion may also prove fatal. Irritation of the eyes comes from contact with the dust, as well as irritation or ulceration of the skin.

Uses
Ammonium fluorosilicate finds use as a disinfectant, and it is useful in etching glass, metal casting, and electroplating.  It is also used to help neutralize washing machine water as laundry sour.

See also

 Hexafluorosilicic acid
 Sodium fluorosilicate

References

External links 
Primitive hexagonal packing

Ammonium compounds
Hexafluorosilicates